Ghetto Love is the debut studio album by American R&B singer Jaheim. It was released in 2001 and features the hit singles "Could It Be", and "Just in Case". It debuted at number 9 on the Billboard 200 with first-week sales of 80,000 copies and ended up being certified platinum by the RIAA selling a million copies in the United States.

Although this album contains explicit lyrics, this album never had a Parental Advisory label. However, it is marked as such in digital distribution and streaming platforms.

Track listing
"Intro" – 1:06
"Du & Jah" – 0:45
"Looking for Love" – 3:53
"Answering Machine (Interlude)" – 0:21
"Let It Go" (featuring Castro) – 2:46
"Could It Be" – 3:44
"Ghetto Love" – 4:22
"Happiness" – 3:15
"Jah's Seed (Interlude)" – 1:10
"Lil' Nigga Ain't Mine" (featuring Castro, Duganz & Precise) – 3:50
"Finders Keepers" (featuring Lil' Mo) – 3:18
"Just in Case" – 4:23
"Heaven in My Eyes – 3:50
"Anything" (featuring Next) – 4:47
"Waitin' on You" (featuring Miss Jones) – 4:22
"Remarkable" (featuring Terry Dexter) – 4:50
"Ready, Willing & Able" – 4:57
"Love Is Still Here" – 1:30
"Forever" – 4:04
"For Moms" – 1:53
"Could It Be (Anything You Want Remix)" – 3:05

Charts

Weekly charts

Year-end charts

Certifications

References

2000 debut albums
Jaheim albums
Warner Records albums